Sekolah Menengah Kebangsaan Seri Perak (SEMARAK) or formerly known as Sekolah Menengah Telok Anson, is a secondary school located in Teluk Intan in Perak, Malaysia. The school was opened in 1957 but officially named in 1965. It is one of the oldest schools that provides a Malay Stream not only in Perak but also in Malaysia. In 1998 the school was officially listed as a Sekolah Bestari (Smart School).

Emblem
The shield is divided into three sections. The middle section is coloured red symbolizing determination. The other hues that are used are black, white, and yellow which are the official colours of the State of Perak.

In the centre of the emblem is a wreath made from flower of rice which circulates another symbol which is a book which represents knowledge. On top of the book are a coil which represents science and a wheel which symbolizes technology. Passing through the symbol of a book is a torch which represents the Torch of Knowledge.

School anthem

Kami Pelajar Sekolah Seri Perak<br/ >
Tumpukan Tenaga Pastikan Tetap Berjaya*<br/ >
Tujuan Kami Bersih, Suci, dan Murni<br/ >
Nama yang Tertinggi Tetap Kami Hormati<br/ >
Marilah Kita Bekerjasama (Chorus)<br/ >
Tinggikan Taraf Kita<br/ >
Buktikan Setia Setiap Masa<br/ >
Kuatkan Semangat cita-cita<br/ >
Kami Pelajar Berpimpinan Murni<br/ >
Semangat Berkobar untuk Bangsa dan Negara
For the second line of the lyric, the original lyric before altered in the year of 1993 was:Berikrar Berusaha Belajar Terus Belajar

History
It began in 1958 with the name of Sekolah Menengah Telok Anson commemorating Telok Anson. During that time, some students had to study at Sekolah Menengah Kebangsaan Sultan Abdul Aziz while the buildings for the school were under  construction. By 1964, the buildings were complete and were officially opened by Sultan Idris Shah of Perak on January 17, 1965. At that time the school was lacking in proper amenities because there were only few blocks built including few classes, a science lab, an ERT room, a boys hostel, and two houses for teachers. In 1971 more blocks were built such as a big hall and a block for Physics, Chemistry, and Biology labs

In commemoration of the state of Perak, the school was renamed in 1974 as Sekolah Menengah  Seri Perak replacing the name of Sekolah Menengah Telok Anson, followed by the formation of Form 6 Science Stream.

In 1986, three more buildings were built including 10 classrooms and one staffroom and were opened by Perak's YB Menteri Besar, Dato' Sri Ramli Ngah Talib. In 1995 a lecture hall was built, with other buildings in 2002 and 2007.

Principals

January 1964—February 1964: Mr. V. Shanmugam
February 1964—January 1965: Mr. Foong See Toon
January 1965—October 1972: Tuan Haji Zainal Adnan Bin Yang Yahya
October 1972—March 1974: Mr. Zainuddin Bin Yeop Mat Tamin
March 1974—April 1977: Mr. Rozali Bin Nordin
April 1977—October 1978: Tuan Haji Moh Arif Bin Osman
October 1978—December 1979: Mr. Adnan Bin Bashah
January 1980—January 1992: Mr. Zainal Abidin Bin Haji Abdullah
January 1992—October 1997: Tuan Haji Abdullah Bin Othman
October 1997—June 1999: Encik Saharuddin Bin Atan
July 1999—September 2007: Puan Hajah Nor Ainy Binti Abdul Hamid
September 2007—March 2009: Tuan Muhd Suod Bin Mat Thani
March 2009 – 2011&iHajah Naimah Binti Ali
2011-2016 :Tn Haji Masri B Suwarto
2016-2017:Tn Haji Muhd Shafie B Abdul Karim.
2018-Now :Pn Sanafiza Bt Salim

References

External links
SMK Seri Perak's Official Website—

Educational institutions established in 1958
Schools in Perak
1958 establishments in Malaya